Märtha Fredrique Gahn (Fellingsbro, 30 September 1881 – 17 October 1973) was a Swedish textile artist. Together with Elsa Flensburg, Bror Geijer Göthe and Märtha Hjortzberg-Reuterswärd, she was one of the founders of the "Ateljé Handtryck" textile workshop in 1915. In 1935 she became head of the Libraria studio, which produced ecclesiastical textiles for the Church of Sweden. Gahn's work may be found in the collections of the Nationalmuseum the Röhsska Museum, and the Nordic Museum.

A portrait of Gahn by Greta Fahlcrantz is currently in the portrait collection of Gripsholm Castle.

References

Further reading  
 

1881 births
1973 deaths
Swedish textile artists
Women textile artists
Swedish women artists
20th-century Swedish artists
20th-century Swedish women artists
20th-century women textile artists
20th-century textile artists
People from Lindesberg Municipality